In mathematics, the pseudoisotopy theorem is a theorem of Jean Cerf's which refers to the connectivity of a group of diffeomorphisms of a manifold.

Statement 

Cerf's theorem states that, provided M is simply-connected and dim(M) ≥ 5, the group of pseudo-isotopy diffeomorphisms of M is connected.  Equivalently, a diffeomorphism of M is isotopic to the identity if and only if it is pseudo-isotopic to the identity.

Relation to Cerf theory 

The starting point of the proof is to think of the height function as a 1-parameter family of smooth functions on M by considering the function .  One then applies Cerf theory.

References 

Theorems in differential topology
Singularity theory